Miguel Ángel Landa (born November 4, 1936) is a Venezuelan actor, stand-up comedian, and television personality best known for hosting the sketch comedy show, Bienvenidos.

Filmography

External links
 

1936 births
Living people
Venezuelan television personalities
Venezuelan male comedians
Venezuelan male film actors
Venezuelan male telenovela actors
Venezuelan stand-up comedians